The 1937 Manchester Gorton by-election was held on 18 February 1937.  The by-election was held due to the death of the incumbent Labour MP, Joseph Compton.  It was won by the Labour candidate William Wedgwood Benn.

References

1937 in England
1937 elections in the United Kingdom
Gorton
1930s in Greater Manchester